Dorrit E. Jacob  is a German-born Australian geochemist. She is the first woman to serve as Director of the Research School of Earth Sciences at the Australian National University (ANU) where she is a full professor.

Jacob completed her undergraduate studies in mineralogy and geology at the University of Mainz, Germany. She moved to the Georg-August University in University of Göttingen from which she received a Dr. rer. nat., while her PhD thesis work was performed at the Max-Planck Institute for Chemistry.

Jacob was awarded the Heisenberg Chair in Biomineralisation at the University of Mainz in 2012. In 2013 Jacob moved to Australia where she took up an ARC future fellowship at Macquarie University to study the formation of bivalve shells and pearls and how they are used to reconstruct past records of climate change. Her areas of research include biomineralisation, and diamond formation. As of 2020 she leads the Biominerals as Environment Archives project at the ANU.

In May 2021 Jacob was elected a Fellow of the Australian Academy of Science.

As of 2020 she is a full professor at the Australian National University, having joined ANU at the end of 2020.

References

External links 

 ANU profile of Professor Dorrit Jacob
 

Living people
Year of birth missing (living people)
Johannes Gutenberg University Mainz alumni
University of Göttingen alumni
Academic staff of Macquarie University
Academic staff of the Australian National University
Geochemists